A privacy platform is a piece of software or a system that is designed to retain the privacy of its users and operators.

Examples 
 Private.Me
 Geens.com

References

Software
Privacy software